Eugen Sterpu (nickname Gicu; born June 10, 1963), is a Moldovan painter, as was his Estonian wife Viive Sterpu. Sterpu lives and works in Tallinn, Estonia.

Education
Sterpu studied in Arts High School Moldavia from 1975 to 1981 and in State Art Institute of the Estonian SSR from 1981 to 1989. The latter was renamed Eesti Kunstiakadeemia (Estonian Academy of Arts) in 1989. In Estonia he specialized in sculpture. From 1994 to 1995 Sterpu taught at the Moldovan Arts High School in Chişinău.

Exhibitions

Sterpu has had individual and joint exhibitions in Moldova, Romania, Denmark, Estonia, Finland, Sweden and Russia. In April 2012 he held a joint art exhibition with his wife in Turku, Finland.

Technique

Sterpu invented a way of working with pastel colors. He draws on sandpaper and uses linseed oil. The resulting colours are clear and strong. The right coloured passe-partout helps bring out the pure tones and contrast of the colours. Education in sculpture deepened his knowledge about architecture, which is his favourite subject in his works. Most of his works are three-dimensional because of his technique.

In 2004 Estonian Television made a documentary Viive and Eugen Sterpu for the programme series Subjektiiv. Viive Sterpu died in 2012.

Memberships
Viive Sterpu was a member of Estonian Artists' Association.

External links
 
 The Art of Eugen Sterpu

1963 births
Living people
Moldovan painters
20th-century Moldovan painters
Estonian people of Moldovan descent
20th-century Estonian painters
20th-century Estonian male artists
21st-century Estonian male artists
21st-century Estonian painters